Wales have competed in the sport of rugby union since their first international in 1881. They take part in the annual Six Nations Championship and have appeared at every Rugby World Cup.

The records listed below only include performances in test matches. The top five are listed in each category (except when there is a tie for the last place among the five, when all the tied record holders are noted).

Team records

Greatest winning margin

Greatest losing margin

Individual career records

Most caps

Last updated: 18 March 2023. Statistics include officially capped matches only.

Most points

Last updated: 18 March 2023. Statistics include officially capped matches only.

Most tries

Last updated: 18 March 2023. Statistics include officially capped matches only.

Most appearances as captain

Match records

Most points in a match

Most tries in a match

Rugby World Cup records

Career
Most appearances at Rugby World Cup  21 – Alun Wyn Jones (2007, 2011, 2015, 2019) 

Most points at Rugby World Cup  98 – Neil Jenkins (1995, 1999) 

Most tries at Rugby World Cup  10 – Shane Williams (2003, 2007, 2011)

Tournament
Most points at one tournament  57 – Neil Jenkins (1999) 

Most tries at one tournament  7 – Josh Adams (2019)

Match
Most points in one game  23 – Dan Biggar vs England (2015) 

Most tries in one game  4 – Ieuan Evans vs Canada (1987) 

Fastest score at Rugby World Cup  36 seconds – Dan Biggar vs Australia (2019)

Fastest try at Rugby World Cup  2 minutes 8 seconds  – Jonathan Davies vs Georgia (2019)

References

Wales
records